Michael Gonzi (born 23 October 1960) is a Maltese medical doctor and retired politician.

Political career

He was elected to the House of Representatives of Malta in the 2008 Maltese general election and again in the 2013 Maltese general election representing the 12th district. He was previously a member of the Parliamentary Assembly of the Council of Europe from 2003 to 2004.

Party affiliation

He is a member of the Partit Nazzjonalista.

Family background

He is the younger brother of former Prime Minister Lawrence Gonzi and a grandnephew of late Archbishop of the Diocese of Malta Mikiel Gonzi.

See also

 Politics of Malta
 Lawrence Gonzi#Family and early life

References

Living people
1960 births
Members of the House of Representatives of Malta
Nationalist Party (Malta) politicians
21st-century Maltese politicians